The Living Tree in Concert Part One is a live album by Jon Anderson and Rick Wakeman (as Anderson/Wakeman, both previously members of progressive rock band Yes), released in November 2011 by Gonzo Multimedia.

Overview
In a certain way, The Living Tree in Concert Part One is a sort of live-in-concert version of the Anderson/Wakeman's studio album The Living Tree previously released in late 2010.

Cover art
The cover art designed by Mark Wilkinson, is similar to the royal blue background, with yellow and orange colored tree on The Living Tree studio album cover.

Reception
The Living Tree in Concert Part One received a positive review from the New Age Music World blog's author John P. Olsen, stating: «[As a live] complement [to] their earlier in-studio version of The Living Tree release, [...] this new "In Concert CD" is fantastic news to millions of progressive rock music fans everywhere. You can always count on Jon and Rick for new music in a variety of genres!», adding: «Fans of the group Yes have something to cheer about since the CD features some classic Yes songs.», also citing «a concert review describing their songs from Yes [as] a departure from what [one] might expect, but [are] still endearing as [one] can imagine.»

Tracks

All new tracks (taken from 2010's The Living Tree) lyrics by Anderson, music by Wakeman, except "Just One Man" (lyrics: Anderson; music: Jeremy Cubert; music performed by Wakeman).

All Yes or ABWH tracks, see the related Yes album articles.

Personnel
Jon Anderson – vocals, acoustic guitars
Rick Wakeman – piano, keyboards and synthesisers

References

External links
Official Rick Wakeman Website
Official Jon Anderson Website
Jon Anderson's Official Facebook Page
Official Yes Website

Jon Anderson albums
Rick Wakeman albums
2011 albums